The King Island Pluton is a mid-to-late Miocene intrusion of syenite and alkali granite on the Central Coast of British Columbia, Canada. The pluton is exposed in  cliffs along the Dean and Burke channels west of Bella Coola.

The King Island Pluton is petrographically similar to the shield volcanoes in the central Anahim Volcanic Belt. As a result, the pluton is thought to represent the magma chamber of an extinct volcanic centre that has since eroded away.

References

Igneous intrusions
Anahim Volcanic Belt
Central Coast of British Columbia
Miocene magmatism